Designs with Strings, also Designs for Strings ( or pour les six), is a ballet choreographed by John Taras to music from the second movement of Tschaikovsky's Trio in A minor. It was first performed on 6 February 1948 in Edinburgh by the Metropolitan Ballet.

References

Sources
The Oxford Dictionary of Dance (p.131), Debra Craine, Judith Mackrell, 2nd ed 2010 ]

1948 ballet premieres
Ballets by John Taras
Ballets to the music of Pyotr Ilyich Tchaikovsky